Roztoki may refer to the following places in Poland:
Roztoki, Lower Silesian Voivodeship (south-west Poland)
Roztoki, Kuyavian-Pomeranian Voivodeship (north-central Poland)
Roztoki, Subcarpathian Voivodeship (south-east Poland)
Roztoki, Lubusz Voivodeship (west Poland)
Roztoki, West Pomeranian Voivodeship (north-west Poland)